British–Danish relations are foreign relations between the United Kingdom and Denmark.  The United Kingdom has an embassy in Copenhagen and Denmark has an embassy in London.  Both countries are full members of Council of Europe and NATO.

History

Middle Ages

Gunboat War

The long decades of peace came to an abrupt end during the Napoleonic Wars. Britain felt threatened by the Armed Neutrality Treaty of 1794, which originally involved Denmark and Sweden, and later Prussia and Russia. The British fleet attacked Copenhagen in 1801 (Battle of Copenhagen (1801)), destroying much of Denmark's navy. Denmark nonetheless managed to remain uninvolved in the Napoleonic Wars until 1807. The British fleet bombarded Copenhagen again that year, causing considerable destruction to the city. They then captured the entire Danish fleet so that it couldn't be used by France to invade Britain (as the French had lost their own fleet at Trafalgar in 1805), leading to the Gunboat War (1807–1814). The confiscation of the Danish navy was widely criticised in Britain.

In 1809 Danish forces fighting on the French side participated in defeating the anti-Bonapartist German rebellion led by Ferdinand von Schill, at the Battle of Stralsund. By 1813, Denmark could no longer bear the war costs, and the state was bankrupt. When in the same year the Sixth Coalition isolated Denmark by clearing Northern Germany of French forces, Frederick VI had to make peace. Accordingly, the unfavourable Treaty of Kiel was concluded in January 1814 with Sweden and Great Britain, and another peace was signed with Russia in February.

The Treaty of Kiel transferred Heligoland to Great Britain and Norway from the Danish to the Swedish crown, Denmark was to be satisfied with Swedish Pomerania. But the Norwegians revolted, declared their independence, and elected crown-prince Christian Frederick (the future Christian VIII) as their king. However, the Norwegian independence movement failed to attract any support from the European powers. After a brief war with Sweden, Christian had to abdicate in order to preserve Norwegian autonomy, established in a personal union with Sweden. In favour of the Kingdom of Prussia, Denmark renounced her claims to Swedish Pomerania at the Congress of Vienna (1815), and instead was satisfied with the Duchy of Lauenburg and a Prussian payment of 3.5 million talers, also, Prussia took over a Danish 600,000 talers debt to Sweden.

Relations between the two countries were normalised as the nineteenth century progressed and they have remained cordial.

In 1961, a maritime dispute over fishing rights off the Faroe Islands, led to the Red Crusader incident.

21st century 
The 2021 Baltic Sea incident was between British and Danish boats.

Cooperation
Danish forces fought alongside British forces in operations in Iraq and they continued this cooperation in Afghanistan. Denmark and United Kingdom work closely together on counter-terrorism issues.

State visits
Queen Margrethe II of Denmark paid state visits to the United Kingdom in April/May 1974, and in February 2000. Queen Elizabeth II of the United Kingdom paid state visits to Denmark in May 1957, and in May 1979.

On 19 August 2010, Danish Prime Minister Lars Løkke Rasmussen visited London, to meet British Prime Minister David Cameron.

On 1 October 2022, British Prime Minister Liz Truss welcomed Danish Prime Minister Mette Frederiksen to 10 Downing Street.

See also
 Foreign relations of Denmark
 Foreign relations of the United Kingdom 
 EU–UK relations
 Danish in the United Kingdom
 Britons in Denmark

Notes and references

External links

  British Foreign and Commonwealth Office about relations with Denmark
  British embassy in Copenhagen
 Danish embassy in London
 The Anglo-Danish Society

 
United Kingdom
Bilateral relations of the United Kingdom